Gordon R. Hall (born 1926) was a justice of the Utah Supreme Court from 1977 to 1993. He served as chief justice from 1981 to 1993, which is longer than any chief justice in Utah history.

Early legal career
Hall practiced law in Tooele, Utah. He was attorney-adviser for the commanding officer at the Tooele Army Depot from 1953 to 1958. At different points in his career, he was town attorney for Wendover and Stockton, and Grantsville city attorney. He was elected three times as Tooele County Attorney.

Judicial career

Hall was appointed to the Third District Court in 1969. Governor Scott M. Matheson appointed him to the Utah Supreme Court in 1977. He became chief justice following the death of his predecessor in that office, Richard Johnson Maughan. During Hall's tenure as Chief Justice, the Utah Constitution was changed to make the judiciary independent. Utah's Judiciary gave him the Distinguished Jurist Award in 1988. He served as President of the Conference of Chief Justices, chairman of the Utah Judicial Council, and chairman of the board of the National Center for State Courts.

In 2007, the new Tooele County Courthouse was named in his honor.  When it opened, it was the only Utah courthouse named for a judge.

References

Justices of the Utah Supreme Court
1926 births
People from Tooele, Utah
Living people
Chief Justices of the Utah Supreme Court
S.J. Quinney College of Law alumni